is a Japanese film directed by Tatsushi Ōmori and starring Sosuke Ikematsu and Masaki Suda. It is a live action film adaptation of the Japanese manga series of the same name written and illustrated by Kazuya Konomoto.

Cast
Sosuke Ikematsu as Utsumi
Masaki Suda as Seto
Ayami Nakajo as Ichigo Kashimura 

Amane Okayama
Isao Okamura
Kumi Kasa

Production
The film was announced in April 2015 on volume 3 of the manga. Principal photography started in the fall of 2015.

References

External links
 

Live-action films based on manga
Films directed by Tatsushi Ōmori
2010s Japanese films